The Stillest Hour is the second studio album by former Australian Idol star Carl Riseley. It was released on 24 April 2009 in Australia.

Track listing 
"Tenderly" (Walter Gross, Jack Lawrence)- 5:10
"The Stillest Hour" (Ford Turrell) – 3:54
"When I Fall in Love" (Edward Heyman, Victor Young) – 4:53
"Come Away with Me" (Norah Jones) – 3:24
"Never Give Up" (Ron Sexsmith) – 3:37
"My Funny Valentine" (Lorenz Hart, Richard Rodgers)- 4:48
"Arms of a Woman" (Amos Lee, Ryan Massaro) – 4:43
"The Way You Are Tonight" (Don Walker) – 4:28
"Don't Let Me Be Lonely Tonight" (James Taylor) – 4:11
"Magnolia" (John Cale) – 3:30
"Reprise (The Stillest Hour)" – 1:39

Charts

Sources 
 GetMusic.com.au – Carl Riseley
 News.com.au/AdelaideNow: Article by NATHAN DAVIES (23 May 2009)

References 

2009 albums